Las Heras Airport is a public use airport serving Las Heras, a town in the oil and gas production region of Santa Cruz Province in Argentina. The airport is at the west edge of the town.

See also

Transport in Argentina
List of airports in Argentina

References

External links 
OpenStreetMap - Las Heras

OurAirports - Las Heras Airport

Airports in Santa Cruz Province, Argentina
Santa Cruz Province, Argentina